Jaden Rae (formerly Jaden Hair) is a television chef, author of two best-selling cookbooks as well as the international best-selling Microdosing Guide & Journal, a food columnist, food photographer, and food blogger in Las Vegas. Specializing in fast, fresh, and simple Asian cooking, she has also created food-based wellness programs such as Buddha Bowls and Reverse Meal Plans.

In 2005, she founded Steamy Kitchen, which remains one of the biggest blogs in the world, with nearly half a billion page views and over 75 million unique users.

Jaden is regularly featured on Daytime Show and The List and has been a columnist for Discovery Health Channel, TLC, BlogHer and The Tampa Tribune. Her cookbooks include "" and "". She is also the author of international bestseller "ASIN B0B37JM4T9  the Microdosing Guide And Journal". She maintains a regular and active social media presence.

'SlashFood readers voted Jaden its #1 hottest woman in food. Forbes Magazine and The Daily Meal'' list Jaden as one of the best food bloggers.

Personal
Jaden was born in Hong Kong and raised in North Platte, Nebraska. She lives with her two sons Andrew and Nathan. She moved from San Francisco to Lakewood Ranch, Florida, and finally Las Vegas, where she has a garden.

Jaden has been open about her former battle with depression and alcoholism and how microdosing with psychedelics has changed her life by allowing her to overcome addiction and leave behind the negative side effects of traditional antidepressants. In spring of 2022, she released the Microdosing Guide And Journal, a "tutorial-workbook combination that was created as a companion for those who microdose (or who are looking to start) and as a way to track and reflect on their journey." In late 2022, she created a community called Magic & Glow, which focuses on discussion and education around wellness and plant medicines. In 2023, she became a monthly columnist for Vegas Cannabis Magazine, contributing 2 articles per issue focused on educational information about psychedelics and how create psychedelic-infused dishes.

References

External links

Living people
American broadcasters
American food writers
American writers of Chinese descent
American publishers (people)
American television chefs
American male chefs
American cookbook writers
Hong Kong people
Hong Kong emigrants to the United States
Women cookbook writers
American women chefs
Year of birth missing (living people)
21st-century American women